Degaña is a municipality in the Autonomous Community of the Principality of Asturias, Spain. It is bordered on the north by Cangas del Narcea, on the south by the Autonomous Community of Castilla y León, and on the west by Ibias. Degaña is also the name of one of the three parishes in the municipality.

Parishes
Zarréu
Degaña
Trabáu

References

External links
Federación Asturiana de Concejos 
Blog about Degaña / Blog con información sobre el municipio de Degaña y sus gentes 
Web site with info about Degaña/Página web con información sobre Degaña 

Municipalities in Asturias